Sergejs is a masculine Latvian given name. Notable people with the name include:

Sergejs Boldaveško (born 1970), Latvian ice hockey player
Sergejs Dolgopolovs (born 1941), Latvian politician
Sergejs Fjodorovs (born 1956), Latvian politician
Sergejs Inšakovs (born 1971), Latvian sprinter
Sergejs Kožans (born 1986), Latvian footballer
Sergejs Maģers (1912–1989), Latvian footballer
Sergejs Mirskis (born 1952), Latvian politician
Sergejs Naumovs (born 1969), Latvian ice hockey player
Sergejs Pečura (born 1987), Latvian ice hockey player
Sergejs Potapkins (born 1977), Latvian politician
Sergejs Semjonovs (born 1959), Latvian footballer and manager
Sergejs Seņins (born 1972), Latvian ice hockey player
Sergejs Žoltoks (1972–2004), Latvian ice hockey player

See also
Sergius (name)

Latvian masculine given names